Ruth Alice Allen (July 28, 1889, Cameron, Texas - October 7, 1979, Austin, Texas) was an American economist and academic who specialized in institutional economics.

Personal life and education
Allen was born on July 28, 1889 in Cameron, Texas,  and earned her B.A. degree from the University of Texas at Austin in 1921 and her M.A. from the same university two years later. She received her Ph.D. from the University of Chicago in 1931. Her doctoral advisor was Harry A. Millis and her dissertation committee included Frank Knight and Paul Douglas.

Career
Allen returned to Texas for the rest of her career, briefly serving as chair of the Department of Economics (1942–43), but spending most of the next two decades as the department's graduate advisor until her retirement in 1959. After retiring for the first time, she spent six years at Huston–Tillotson College to preserve its accreditation before retiring again in 1968.

Allen's most important works, The Labor of Women in the Production of Cotton, a revision of her 1933 dissertation, and East Texas Lumber Workers (1961), were fact-based socioeconomic surveys of those Texas industries through the lens of institutional economics. Allen designed the questionnaires herself and personally conducted most of the interviews.

Notes

References

External links
 

1889 births
1979 deaths
Economists from Texas
American women economists
University of Texas at Austin College of Liberal Arts alumni
University of Texas at Austin faculty
University of Chicago alumni
Institutional economists
People from Cameron, Texas
20th-century American economists
20th-century American women